There are numerous prehistorical and early historical ringworks and fortification ramparts in Central Europe that have erroneously, usually colloquially, been given the name Schwedenschanze, which means "Swedish redoubt", a schanze being a hastily erected, military fieldwork.

History 
This name arose in connexion with the fighting during the Thirty Years' War, when the population of the Holy Roman Empire often used old field fortifications as refuge castles or hidden livestock pens. Particularly in Catholic areas this action was taken to protect people from the Protestant forces of the Swedish king, Gustavus II Adolphus. Whether the individual fortifications were actually used as fighting positions, however, is usually speculative. Many of the often well preserved earthworks in the forests of Europe were probably later associated wrongly with this religious war.

The history of these heritage sites often goes back several thousand years. They were frequently extended during the Early Middle Ages, for example, to defend East Francia and other regions in the 10th century from the Hungarian invasions.

It is true that in the 17th century, during the Thirty Years' War, numerous earthworks and schanzen were thrown up during the conflict. But these are clearly distinguishable from the older sites by their regular, geometric shapes. Occasionally there were also fortifications that were actually built by the Imperial Army, i.e. Catholic League troops that were later called Schwedenschanzen; such as the Schwedenschanze in the Rhön.

Schwedenschanzen

Germany 
 Schwedenschanze (Altastenberg) near Altastenberg, North Rhine-Westphalia
 Schwedenschanze (Belm) near Belm, Lower Saxony
 Schwedenwälle or Schwedenschanzen between Brandenburg an der Havel and Brielow
 Schwedenschanze in Buckow (Rietz-Neuendorf), near Beeskow, Brandenburg
 Turmhügel Schwedenschanze (Burghaig), county of Kulmbach, Bavaria
 Turmhügel Schwedenschanze (Kulmbach), county of Kulmbach, Bavaria
 Schwedenschanze (Canstein) near Marsberg-Canstein im Roten Land, North Rhine-Westphalia
 Schwedenschanze (Deesbach) near Neuhaus am Rennweg in the Thuringian Forest
 Schwedenschanze (Delitzsch) am Neuhäuser See, Saxony
 Schwedenschanze (Dornberg) near Bielefeld-Dornberg, North Rhine-Westphalia
 Schwedenschanze (Dörscheid) near Dörscheid, Rhineland-Palatinate
 Ringwall Schwedenschanze (Elfershausen) near Elfershausen in Lower Franconia, Bavaria
 Schwedenschanze (Elmshorn) im Liether Wald in Elmshorn, Schleswig-Holstein
 Schwedenschanze (Frickingen) near Frickingen, Baden-Württemberg
 Schwedenschanze (Gersfeld) near Rodenbach in the Rhön near the Reesberg, Hesse
 Schwedenschanze (Gotha) near Gotha in Thuringia
 Schwedenschanze in the Dölauer Heide in Halle (Saale), Saxony-Anhalt
 Schwedenschanze (Haßberge) on the Kamm der Haßberge, Bavaria
 Ringwall Schwedenschanze (Heiligenstadt in Oberfranken) northwest of Heiligenstadt in Oberfranken, Bavaria
 Schwedenschanze (Höchstadt an der Aisch) in Höchstadt an der Aisch, Bavaria
 Schwedenschanze (Höhbeck) in the Elbtalaue Wendland Nature Park, Lower Saxony
 Schwedenschanze Isingerode near Isingerode, Lower Saxony
 Schwedenschanze (Kelsterbach) in Kelsterbach, Hesse
 Schwedenschanze (Klein Hutbergen) near Verden (Aller), Lower Saxony
 Schwedenschanze (Lossow) near Frankfurt (Oder), Brandenburg
 Schwedenschanze (Neppermin) in Neppermin on Usedom, see Burgwall Neppermin, Mecklenburg-Western Pomerania
 Schwedenschanze (Nisselsbach) near Aichach, Bavaria
 Abschnittsbefestigung Schwedenschanze (Oberlangheim), Bavaria
 Schwedenschanze (Peenemünde) in Peenemünde on Usedom, Mecklenburg-Western Pomerania
 Schwedenschanze (Pohnsdorf) near Pohnsdorf, Schleswig-Holstein
 Ringwall Schwedenschanze (Kützberg) near Poppenhausen, Bavaria
 Schwedenschanze (Preußisch Oldendorf) near Preußisch Oldendorf-Börninghausen on the Egge, North Rhine-Westphalia
 Schwedenschanze (Rohrhardsberg) on the Rohrhardsberg, Baden-Württemberg
 Ringwall Schwedenschanze (Rottenstein Forest), Hofheim in Lower Franconia in the county of Haßberge in Bavaria
 Schwedenschanze (Schlangen) near Schlangen-Oesterholz, North Rhine-Westphalia
 Schwedenschanze (Spessart) near Alzenau northwest of Mömbris, Bavaria
 Schwedenschanze (Stade) in the Stade village of Groß Thun, Lower Saxony
 Schwedenschanze (Stralsund) near Stralsund, Mecklenburg-Western Pomerania
 Schwedenschanze (Teublitz) in Teublitz, Bavaria
 Schwedenschanze (Vlotho) in Vlotho, North Rhine-Westphalia
 Schwedenschanze (Weitenhagen) in Weitenhagen, Mecklenburg-Western Pomerania
 Schwedenschanze (Zuflucht) in the Northern Black Forest

Austria 
From west to east:
 Schwedenschanze (Lochau) in Lochau, Vorarlberg
 Schwedenschanze (Oberhaag) near Aigen-Schlägl, Upper Austria
 Schwedenschanze (Bad Leonfelden) near Bad Leonfelden, Upper Austria
 Schwedenschanze (Achatzberg) near Klam, Upper Austria
 Schwedenschanze (Engelstein) near Großschönau, Lower Austria
 Schwedenschanze (Buschberg) in the Leiser Berge, Lower Austria

Switzerland 
 Schwedenschanze (Beggingen) on the Randen (mountain), Beggingen, canton of Schaffhausen

Czech Republic 
 Švédské šance (Horní Moštěnice)
 Švédské šance (Kovářská)

See also 
 Redoubt
Schwedendamm near Wolfenbüttel
 Ringwall Schwedenschanze
 Burgstall Schwedenschanze

External links 

Fortifications by type